Events in the year 1926 in India.

Incumbents
 Emperor of India – George V
 Viceroy of India – The Earl of Reading
 Viceroy of India – The Lord Irwin (from 3 April)

Events
 National income - 33,374 million
 April – Hindu-Muslim strike in Calcutta.
 15 July – BEST buses make its début in Bombay.
 24 November – Sri Aurobindo retires, leaving the Mother to run the Sri Aurobindo Ashram in Pondicherry.

Law
 1 October − Public Service Commission established, it was later reconstituted as Federal Public Service Commission by the Government of India Act 1935 only to be renamed as today's Union Public Service Commission after the independence.
Trade Unions Act
Good Conduct Prisoners Probational Release Act
Indian Bar Councils Act
Cotton Industry (Statistics) Act

Births

January to June
8 January – Kelucharan Mohapatra, Odissi dancer and guru (died 2004).
16 January – O. P. Nayyar, film music director and composer (died 2007).
20 January 
 Jamiluddin Aali, poet, critic, playwright, essayist, columnist, and scholar. (died 2015)
 Qurratulain Hyder, novelist and short story writer, academic and journalist (died 2007).
21 January – Laxman Pai, artist (died 2021)
26 May – Sukumar Azhikode, teacher, critic and orator. (died 2012)
6 June – Sunil Dutt, Bollywood actor and producer (died 2005)

July to December
21 July – Rahimuddin Khan, Pakistani general and politician (died 2022 in Pakistan).
15 August – Sukanta Bhattacharya, poet (died 1947).
3 September – Uttam Kumar, actor (died 1980).
8 October – Raaj Kumar, actor (died 1996).
21 November – Prem Nath, actor (died 1992).
23 November - Sathya Sai Baba, guru, philanthropist, educator (died 2011).
26 November – Yash Pal, scientist and educator.
31 December – Zahoor Qasim, marine scientist.

Full date unknown
J. P. Chandrababu, comedian-actor, singer and dancer (died 1974).
Nalini Jaywant, actress.

Deaths

References

 
India
Years of the 20th century in India